is a Japanese politician of the Democratic Party of Japan, a member of the House of Representatives in the Diet (national legislature). A native of Niigata, Niigata and graduate of the University of Tokyo, he worked at Ernst & Young ShinNihon from 2001 to 2005. He was elected to the House of Representatives for the first time in 2005.

Right-wing positions
He was a supporter of right-wing filmmaker Satoru Mizushima's 2007 revisionist film The Truth about Nanjing, which denied that the Nanking Massacre ever occurred.

References

External links 
 Official website in Japanese.

1977 births
Living people
People from Niigata (city)
University of Tokyo alumni
Japanese accountants
Members of the House of Representatives (Japan)
Democratic Party of Japan politicians
Nanjing Massacre deniers
21st-century Japanese politicians